Strobilepis is an extinct genus of Devonian-Carboniferous Multiplacophoran bearing close similarity to Polysacos.

References

Devonian molluscs
Carboniferous molluscs
Prehistoric chiton genera
Late Devonian animals